Arsen Agjabayov (born 11 September 2000) is an Azerbaijani footballer who plays as a defender for Sabail in the Azerbaijan Premier League.

Club career
On 15 February 2020, Agjabayov made his debut in the Azerbaijan Premier League for Sabah match against Sumgayit.

References

External links
 

2000 births
Living people
Association football defenders
Azerbaijani footballers
Azerbaijan youth international footballers
Azerbaijan under-21 international footballers
Azerbaijan Premier League players
Sabah FC (Azerbaijan) players
Sabail FK players